Bullseye Lake is a very small pond lying near the center of an elliptical depression in the Insel Range,  northeast of Mount Boreas, in Victoria Land. The name was applied in 1964 by American geologist Parker E. Calkin and is apparently descriptive of its position and small size.

References 

Lakes of Victoria Land
McMurdo Dry Valleys